Manuel Rubio (born 13 September 1951) is a Spanish archer. He competed in the men's individual event at the 1984 Summer Olympics.

References

1951 births
Living people
Spanish male archers
Olympic archers of Spain
Archers at the 1984 Summer Olympics
Place of birth missing (living people)